Fernando Dalla Fontana (born 10 April 1958) is an Argentine former professional tennis player. He is known by his nickname "Dalla"

Born and raised in Santa Fe, Dalla Fontana was a 1976 French Open junior semi-finalist and won a Galea Cup with the national team in 1977.

Dalla Fontana featured in two Davis Cup ties for Argentina, debuting as an 18-year old. Both of his two career ties were against Ecuador and he had singles wins over Miguel Olvera and Raúl Viver. 

On the professional circuit he reached a best singles world ranking of 134, with a main draw appearance at the 1981 French Open and three Grand Prix quarter-finals amongst his achievements.

See also
List of Argentina Davis Cup team representatives

References

External links
 
 
 

1958 births
Living people
Argentine male tennis players
Sportspeople from Santa Fe, Argentina